Rio Sidra is a densely populated island town in the San Blas Archipelago of the Kuna Yala comarca (indigenous province) of Panama. Among the native Guna population, the island is called, Urgandi. Rio Sidra is a municipality or corregimiento of Narganá.

In the 2010 census by National Institute of Statistics and Census of Panama, the estimated population of Rio Sidra is 856 and the number of households is 129.

See also

 List of islands by population density

References 

Populated places in Guna Yala